James Patrick Heron (born March 21, 1940) was a provincial level politician from Alberta, Canada. He served as a member of the Legislative Assembly of Alberta from 1986 to 1989.

Political career
Heron ran for a seat to the Alberta Legislature in the 1986 Alberta general election. He won the electoral district of Stony Plain to hold it for the governing Progressive Conservative party. Heron ran for a second term in the 1989 Alberta general election he was defeated by New Democrat candidate Stan Woloshyn in a hotly contested race.

References

External links
Legislative Assembly of Alberta Members Listing

1940 births
Living people
Politicians from Edmonton
Progressive Conservative Association of Alberta MLAs